Larkipora, also known as Larkipur, is a model town and a notified area committee in the Anantnag district of the Indian union territory of Jammu and Kashmir and is the business hub of adjacent villages Lukbawan  Kuchipora, Fatehpora, Shepora, Gund Fatehpora, Dooru, Hakura, Khushipora, Sadoora Nageenpora, Zaldora, Dehruna, Shakerpora, Dialgam among others.

References 

Villages in Anantnag district
Ancient Indian cities